A paradox is a self-contradictory or counter-intuitive statement or argument.

Paradox may also refer to:

Places 

 Paradox, New York, a hamlet near Schroon, in Essex County, New York, United States
 Paradox Lake, a lake in Schroon, Essex County, New York, United States
 Paradox Valley, a valley in Colorado, United States
 Paradox, Colorado, an unincorporated town in Paradox Valley
 Paradox Basin, named after Paradox Valley
 Paradox Formation, a geological formation deriving its name from Paradox Valley

People
 Paradox (musician) (born 1972), British drum and bass musician
 Giulio Trogli (1613–1685), Italian Baroque painter who was known as il Paradosso ("the Paradox")

Science and technology 
 Category:Mathematical paradoxes
 Paradoxes of set theory
 Paradox (database), a relational-database-management system
 Paradox (theorem prover), an automated theorem-proving system
 Paradox (warez), a software-cracking warez/demogroup
 Paradox, a human-powered vehicle that competed in the Australian HPV Super Series in 2011 and 2013
 Physical paradox, an apparent contradiction in physical descriptions of the universe

Arts, entertainment, and media

Fictional entities
 Paradox, a character appearing in the comic book series Marvel Preview
 Paradox, the villain in the movie Yu-Gi-Oh!: Bonds Beyond Time
 Faction Paradox, a fictional group in the Doctor Who universe
 Professor Paradox, a recurring character on the 2008–2010 American animated television series Ben 10: Alien Force
 Paradox Pokémon, a group of Pokémon appeared in Pokémon Scarlet and Violet

Music

Groups
 Paradox (Canadian band), a Canadian rock band that existed from 1984 to 1991
 Paradox (German band), a German thrash metal band formed in 1986
 Paradox (Irish band), an Irish alternative rock band formed in 1996
 Paradox (Thai band), a Thai alternative rock band formed in 1996
 Paradox (British band), a Christian black metal band

Albums
 Paradoks, by Ahmet Koç
 Paradox (Balzac album), 2009
 Paradox (John Kay and Steppenwolf album), 1984
 Paradox (Nanase Aikawa album), 1997
 Paradox (Royal Hunt album), 1997
 Paradox (Isyana Sarasvati album), 2017

Songs
 "Paradox", by Kansas on the 1977 album Point of Know Return
 "Paradox" (Mari Hamada song), 1991
 "Paradox", by Hypocrisy on the 1996 album Abducted
 "Paradox", by Hawkwind on the 2000 live album Atomhenge 76
 "Paradox", by Keith Jarrett on the 2002 album Always Let Me Go
 "Paradox", by Sepultura on the 2009 album A-Lex
 "Paradox", a song from the soundtrack for the 2010 film 4.3.2.1

Films 
 Paradox (2010 film), a 2010 Canadian science-fiction film starring Kevin Sorbo
 Paradox (2016 film), an American sci-fi / action film
 Paradox (2017 film), a Hong Kong action film
 Paradox (2018 film), a film directed by Daryl Hannah
 Paradox (soundtrack), a soundtrack album by Neil Young and Promise of the Real

Television 
 Paradox (British TV series), a 2009 British science-fiction, police-drama television series broadcast by BBC
 Paradox (2014 TV series), a Georgian-Ukrainian horror thriller television series
 "Paradox", a season 4 episode of Art:21
 "Paradox" (The Flash), an episode of The Flash

Other arts, entertainment, and media
 Paradox (assemblage), artwork by Christian Verdun
 Paradox (literature), a literary device
 Paradox (magazine), a historical fiction magazine

Brands and enterprises
 Paradox Development Studio, a video-game developer and subsidiary of Paradox Interactive
 Paradox Interactive, a video-game publisher
 Paradox Press, a defunct division of DC Comics

Other uses 
 Paradox gun a shotgun (usually smoothbore) with partially rifled barrels 
 Paradox (horse) (1882–1890), a British Thoroughbred racehorse and sire
 Paradox, an English ship that participated in the Battle of the Kentish Knock
 The Paradox, a South Baltimore dance club

See also 
 List of paradoxes